Eric Barrington "Barry" Keverne FRS FMedSci (born ) is a British behavioural neuroscientist, Professor of Behavioural Neuroscience, 1998–2009, now Emeritus, and Fellow of King's College, Cambridge.

External links
 Interviewed by Alan Macfarlane 23 March 2009 (video)

References 

1940s births
Living people
Fellows of the Royal Society
Fellows of the Academy of Medical Sciences (United Kingdom)
Fellows of King's College, Cambridge